11 Leonis Minoris is a binary star located 36.5 light years away from Earth, in the northern constellation of Leo Minor. It is visible to the naked eye as a dim, yellow-hued star with an apparent visual magnitude of 5.54. The system is moving away from the Earth with a heliocentric radial velocity of +14.4 km/s. It has a relatively high proper motion, traversing the celestial sphere at the rate of 0.764 arc seconds per annum.

The primary component is a G-type main-sequence star with a stellar classification of G8V, which is slightly less massive and slightly dimmer than the Sun. This is an RS Canum Venaticorum variable star with its luminosity varying by 0.033 magnitudes over a period of 18 days. Compared to the Sun, it has more than double the abundance of elements more massive than helium—what astronomers term the star's metallicity.

There is a secondary component, a 14th magnitude red dwarf star much dimmer than the primary. The pair have an orbital period of 201 years with a high eccentricity of 0.88.

References

External links
 

G-type main-sequence stars
M-type main-sequence stars
Solar-type stars
RS Canum Venaticorum variables
Binary stars
Leo Minor
Durchmusterung objects
Leonis Minoris, 11
0356
082885
Leonis Minoris, SV
047080
3815